Sir Godfrey Yeatman Lagden  (1 September 1851 – 26 June 1934) was a British colonial administrator in Africa.

Early life
Lagden was born at Yetminster, Dorset, the son of Reverend Richard Dowse Lagden of Balsham House, Cambridgeshire and was educated at Sherborne School. He joined the British civil service as a clerk in the General Post Office where he worked from 1869 to 1877, when he decided to move to South Africa.

Career in Africa
There he was introduced to the South African High Commissioner Sir Bartle Frere who sent him to the Transvaal Republic which had been newly annexed by Sir Theophilus Shepstone. There he would be initially appointed to its executive council.

He entered the colonial secretary's office in Pretoria and was private secretary to the new Administrator of the Transvaal, Sir Owen Lanyon, 1878–81. Lagden and Lanyon were in Pretoria when the town was besieged during the First Boer War. After the war, Lanyon was recalled to London, but Lagden remained and was briefly private secretary to Sir Evelyn Wood before returning to England in 1882. There he was engaged as war correspondent for the Daily Telegraph in Egypt, covering the British campaign against the ‘Urabi Revolt. He was one of a small party that entered Cairo ahead of the main force to demand its surrender. He took part in the charge at Kassassin and would deliver information essential to Sir Garnet Wolseley in his efforts to harass the army of Ahmed ʻUrabi and its eventual fall at the Battle of Tell El Kebir.

On his return in 1883, he was appointed Assistant Colonial Secretary in Sierra Leone but was sent to do some brief work in the Gold Coast. On the completion of the work there he was ordered to return to Sierra Leone by the Governor Sir Samuel Rowe. He decided to take leave instead and visited Kumasi, the first by a white man in twenty years, where he was captured and tried and he then escaped after being sentenced to die. After that, he fell out with the governor  Rowe, and was sacked by the Colonial Office. However, a friend he had made in Pretoria, Marshal Clarke, had just been appointed resident commissioner in Basutoland in 1884 and insisted that Lagden be re-engaged to work for him as his secretary, which he did and eventually succeeded Clarke as resident commissioner 1893–1901. In Basutoland, he managed to control the infighting between tribes in the country and succeed in establishing hut taxes and their collection.

During the Second Boer War, which broke out in 1899, Lagden did all he could to keep Basutoland neutral ensuring the war did not draw in black soldiers. When he raised a force of 10,000 Basotho's and refused to use them to ensure the relief of Wepener other than to watch over the Cape Mounted Rifles, who were besieged by Boer forces until they were relieved by other British units. During the war, he raised and commanded the Transvaal Light Infantry.

In 1901 he was appointed commissioner of native affairs by Lord Milner in the Transvaal Colony, by then under British control and was also a member of its executive and legislative councils.  During 1903 until 1905, he was chairman of the South African Native Affairs Commission and took evidence from all over South Africa and Rhodesia.

Later life
He retired in 1907 after the Transvaal Colony gained self-rule and returned to Weybridge in England and served on various public bodies including the Royal Colonial Institute of which he was secretary and later vice-president, serving until 1923.

Marriage
He married Frances Rebekah Bousfield in 1887, the daughter of the Bishop of Pretoria.

Honours
Lagden was appointed CMG in 1894 and knighted KCMG in 1897 for his work in Africa, and appointed KBE in 1927 "in
recognition of public services."

Lagden played cricket from time to time, including one first-class cricket match for the Marylebone Cricket Club (MCC) when a team visited South Africa in 1906.

Works

References

External links

1851 births
1934 deaths
English cricketers
Knights Commander of the Order of St Michael and St George
Knights Commander of the Order of the British Empire
People educated at Sherborne School
Resident Commissioners in Basutoland
Transvaal Colony people
Marylebone Cricket Club cricketers